John King (8 January 1902–1988) was an English footballer who played in the Football League for Oldham Athletic.

References

1902 births
1988 deaths
English footballers
Association football forwards
English Football League players
Mossley A.F.C. players
Oldham Athletic A.F.C. players
Rossendale United F.C. players
Ashton National F.C. players
Stalybridge Celtic F.C. players
Bacup Borough F.C. players
South Liverpool F.C. players
Huddersfield Town A.F.C. players